The Focus Foundation, located in Davidsonville, Maryland, is a research foundation dedicated to identifying and assisting families and children who have X and Y Chromosomal Variations (also called X & Y chromosomal variations), dyslexia and/or developmental coordination disorder. These conditions can lead to language-based disabilities, motor planning deficits, reading dysfunction, and attention and behavioral disorders. The Focus Foundation believes that, through increased awareness, early identification, and specific and targeted treatment, children with these conditions can reach their full potential.

The Focus Foundation leads in the research of X and Y Chromosomal Variations with 25% of all publications on the disorders. The foundation also leads the research field in testosterone treatment for the testosterone deficiency associated with extra X chromosomes.

The Focus Foundation was established in 2005 by Carole Samango-Sprouse. Dr. Samango-Sprouse is also the director of the Neurodevelopmental Diagnostic Center for Young Children, located near Annapolis, Maryland, and an associate clinical professor of pediatrics at The George Washington University in Washington, D.C. and an adjunct associate professor in the Department of Human and Molecular Genetics at Florida International University. She serves as the executive director and Chief Science Officer of The Focus Foundation and has experience with the three disorders that are the Foundation's focus: X & Y chromosomal variations, developmental dyspraxia and dyslexia. The Focus Foundation attempts to increase awareness an X and Y chromosomal variations in order to help children with these disorders. Although all physicians, ancillary health care providers and special educators are taught that genetic abnormalities can impact a child's development, practitioners often receive insufficient information about these disorders, and, therefore, do not often test for X & Y chromosomal variations when a child presents with neurodevelopmental concerns. By promoting awareness of these disorders and associated symptoms, The Focus Foundation hopes to increase early identification, implement interventions, and help families pursue optimal outcomes for their children.

Diagnosis of X & Y variations
X & Y variations are common but frequently undiagnosed genetic conditions that differ from the normal sex chromosome pairings of XX for females and XY for males. Errors in recombination during meiosis produce additional X or Y chromosomes when compared to the typical complement of 46,XX or 46,XY. The resulting chromosomes (47 or more) may impact a child's neurodevelopment and cognition. Twenty-one babies born each day have an X & Y chromosomal variation, and only five will be diagnosed in their lifetime.

In addition, twenty percent of school-aged children illustrate signs of learning dysfunction. Given the frequency of X & Y chromosomal variations in the general population, children who present with learning disorders of an unknown etiology should receive genetic testing to rule out these common disorders. Only 5% of children with dyslexia are ever identified in their lifetime although they have symptoms presenting by 6 years of age, while most children with developmental dyspraxia are misdiagnosed with other disorders such as just speech delay, behavior problems, or ADHD.
The Focus Foundation works with healthcare providers, specialists, and parents to properly diagnosis, research, and organize a specific and targeted treatment for children with X & Y chromosomal variations. With the proper diagnosis and intervention, children who have these neurogenetic disorders are transformed from vulnerable to powerful and become more confident, able, and successful than they have ever been.

The Focus Foundation aims to inform professionals and families throughout the country, as well as around the world about these disorders. The organization has hosted  international clinics in the United Kingdom, Italy, and, more recently, Australia. These conferences invite families and physicians for consultations and speeches from a multi-disciplinary team of experts specializing in these disorders. By promoting the spread of accurate and novel information about the incidence, diagnosis, symptoms, and management of these disorders, The Focus Foundation aims to encourage recovery worldwide. With help, all of these children can reach their full potential.

The Focus Foundation consists of scientists, scholars, educators, health care providers, fundraising and marketing experts, and volunteers that work together on these issues and help change these children's lives. The team conducts and presents research projects in order to further expand our understanding of these disorders. The Focus Foundation attends international and domestic meetings in order to foster partnerships in order to research, educate and train medical professionals and the community about developmental disturbances, brain-based intervention, and syndrome-specific treatment.

Conditions Researched 
The Focus Foundation researches and helps families with children who have X and Y chromosomal variations, dyslexia, and/or dyspraxia.
The X and Y Chromosomal Variations studied by The Focus Foundation include:
·	45,X (Turner syndrome):
·	47,XXX (Triple X syndrome; Trisomy X)
·	47,XXY (Klinefelter syndrome)
·	47,XYY (Jacob syndrome)
·	48,XXXY
·	48,XXYY
·	48,XXXX
·	49,XXXXY

Assistance provided 
The Focus Foundation works with families, healthcare providers and educators.

Families 
The Focus Foundation helps families identify and understand specific reasons for their child's difficulties in school, behavioral problems, or developmental delays. In addition, through their research, the team identifies the treatment and management strategies that effectively allow children with X & Y chromosome variations and other rare disorders to reach their optimal outcome. These personalized recommendations are based one years of expertise and impact on health and well being as well as home, school and community life.

Health care practitioners 

Most health care practitioners are not familiar with chromosome variations and, therefore, rarely consider X & Y chromosomal variations as a possible explanation for developmental concerns. The Focus Foundation works to inform practitioners of common signs that might indicate that a child has a chromosome variation, as well as provide resources and partnerships with which to offer genetic testing for these disorders. With the introduction of more accurate and affordable testing, X & Y chromosome variations are beginning to be more widely known in the medical community.

Educators 

The Focus Foundation informs these professionals on how to work with and optimize the outcome in spite of developmental concerns or special needs: from providing teachers with resources and strategies to determining what kinds of outside services each child may need. With the development and administration of appropriate therapeutic intervention, every child has the opportunity to achieve their goals.

Conferences 
The Focus Foundation hosts several conferences annually for different groups; these conferences include expert speakers that specialize in Neurodevelopment, Pediatric Genetics and Neurology, Endocrinology, Orthopedics, Immunology, Physical Therapy, Speech and Language, and Occupational Therapy.

The Atypical Learner Conference 

First held in 2011, The Atypical Learner Conference is designed for parents and caregivers of bright children who might be struggling to succeed in school. This conference focuses on understanding common causes, explanations, and treatments for dyslexia, ADHD, speech delay, school failure, and behavioral difficulties.

Annual Conference for Children with 49,XXXXY 

Now in its sixteenth year, this is the largest gathering of this rare disorder in the world, with attendees traveling from across the United States and the globe. The Maryland conference features patient evaluations by a multidisciplinary team of physicians who specialize in rare chromosomal variations and have established themselves as experts in their fields. These and other experts present pertinent and educational information about 49,XXXXY to parents in order to better equip families to pursue optimal outcomes for their child.

Annual Conference for Children with 48,XXXY 

Similar to the conference for children with 49,XXXXY, this conference focuses on children with 48,XXXY, their families and healthcare providers.

Research 

The Focus Foundation engages in research of the general biological causes and potential treatments of aspects of the phenotype of X and Y Chromosomal Variations. Research includes the impact of each additive X, the potential benefit of testosterone replacement therapy at different integral junctures, and the regional brain differences within each disorder and treatment group.

References 

www.thefocusfoundation.org
Samango-Sprouse, C.; Gropman, A..  X and Y Chromosomal Variations: 
Hormones, Brain Development, and Neurodevelopmental Performance. The Colloquium Digital Library of Life Sciences. October 11, 2016
Tosi, L & Mitchell, F., Porter, G.F., Ruland, L., Gropman, A., Lasutschinkow, P.C., Tran, 
S.L., Rajah, E.N.,Gillies, A.P., Hendire, P., Peret, R., Sadeghin, T., Samango-Sprouse, C.A. Musculoskeletal abnormalities in a large international cohort of boys with 49,XXXXY. Am J Med Genet Part A. [Epub ahead of print].
Samango-Sprouse, C.A., Tran, S., Lasutschinkow, P.C., Sadeghin, T., Powell, S., 
Mitchell, F., and Gropman, A. (2020). Neurodevelopmental outcome of prenatally diagnosed boys with 47,XXY (Klinefelter syndrome) and the potential influence of early hormonal therapy (EHT). Am J Med Genet Part A. [Epub ahead of print].
Lasutschinkow, P.C., Gropman, A., Porter, G.F., Sadeghin, T., & Samango-Sprouse, C. (2020). Behavioral Phenotype of 49,XXXXY Syndrome: Presence of Anxiety-Related Symptoms and Intact Social Awareness. Am J Med Genet: Pt A. 182(5). https://doi.org/10.1002/ajmg.a.61507
Samango-Sprouse, C.A, Yu, C., Porter, G.F, Tipton, E.S., Lasutschinkow, P.C., 
Sadeghin, T. (2020). A Review of the Intriguing Interaction Between Testosterone and Neurocognitive Development in males with 47,XXY. Curr Opin Obstet Gynecol. 32(2):140-146. doi: 10.1097/GCO.0000000000000612.
Tran, S.L., Samango-Sprouse, C.A., Sadeghin, T., Powell, S., Gropman, A.L. (2019). 
Hormonal replacement therapy and its potential influence on working memory and competency/adaptive functioning in 47,XXY (Klinefelter syndrome). Am J Med Genet A. 179(12):2374-2381. Doi:10.1002/ajmg.a.61360.
Samango-Sprouse, C.A, Porter, G.F, Lasutschinkow, P.C, Tran, S.L., Sadeghin, T., 
Gropman, A.L. (2019). Investigating the impact of early diagnosis and non-invasive prenatal testing (NIPT): Knowledge, attitudes, and experiences of parents of children with sex chromosome aneuploidies (SCAs). Prenat Diagn. 40(4):470-480. doi: 10.1002/pd.5580. 
Samango-Sprouse, C.A., Counts, D.R., Tran, S.L., Lasutschinkow, P.C., Porter, 
G.F.,Gropman, A.L. (2019). Update on the clinical perspectives and care of the child with 47,XXY (Klinefelter syndrome). App Clin Genet, 12, 191–202. Doi:10.2147/TACG.S189450 
Samango-Sprouse C, Lasutschinkow P, Powell S, Sadeghin T, Gropman A. (2019). The 
incidence of anxiety symptoms in boys with 47,XXY (Klinefelter syndrome) and the possible impact of timing of diagnosis and hormonal replacement therapy. Am J Med Genet Pt A. 179(3):423-428. https://doi.org/10.1002/ajmg.a.61038
Samango-Sprouse, C., Stapleton, E.J., Chea, S., et al. (2018). International 
Investigation of Neurocognitive and Behavioral Phenotype in 47,XXY (Klinefelter syndrome): Predicting Individual Differences. Am J Med Genet Pt A.76(4):877-885. https://doi.org/10.1002/ajmg.a.38621.
Howard-Bath A, Poulton A, Halliday J, et al. (2018). Population-based trends in the 
prenatal diagnosis of sex chromosome aneuploidy before and after non-invasive prenatal testing. Prenat Diagn. 38(13):1062-1068.
Ramdaney A, Hoskovec J, Harkenrider J, et al. (2018). Clinical experience with sex 
chromosome aneuploidies detected by noninvasive prenatal testing (NIPT): Accuracy and patient decision-making. Prenat Diagn. 38(11):841-848.
Samango-Sprouse C, Keen C, Sadeghin T, et al. (2017).The benefits and limitations of 
cell-free DNA screening for 47,XXY (Klinefelter syndrome). Prenat Diagn. 37(5), 497–501.
Samango-Sprouse, C. (2017). The Benefits and Limitations of cell-free DNA screening 
for 47, XXY (Klinefelter syndrome). Prenat Diag. 37(5):497-501. doi: 10.1002/pd.5044.
Keen, C. Samango-Sprouse, C. Dubbs, H. Zackai, E. (2017).10-year-old Female with 
Intragenic KANSL1 Mutation, no KANSL1-related Intellectual Disability, and Preserved Verbal Intelligence. Am J of Med Genet Pt A. 173(3):762-765. doi: 10.1002/ajmg.a.38080.
Samango-Sprouse, C; Hall, MP; Kırkızlar, E; Curnow, K; Demko, Z; Lawson, P; Gross, 
S; Gropman, A. (2016). Incidence of X and Y Chromosomal Aneuploidy in a Large Child Bearing Population. Public Library of Science (Plos ONE), 11(8), 1–11. doi:10.1371/journal.pone.0161045. 
Samango-Sprouse, Carole; Lawson, P; Sprouse, C; Stapleton, E; Sadeghin, T; 
Gropman, A. (2015). Expanding the Phenotypic Profile of Kleefstra Syndrome: A Female with low-average Intelligence and Childhood Apraxia of Speech. Am J Med Genet Part A, 170(5), 1312, doi:10.1002/ajmg.a.37575. 
Samango-Sprouse C, Stapleton EJ, Lawson P, Mitchell F, Sadeghin T, Powell S, 
Gropman AL. (2015). Positive effects of early androgen therapy on the behavioral phenotype of boys with 47,XXY. Am J Med Genet Part C 169C:150–157.
Samango-Sprouse C, Keen C, Mitchell F, Sadeghin T, Gropman A. (2015). 
Neurodevelopmental variability in three young girls with a rare chromosomal disorder, 48, XXXX. Am J Med Genet Part A 9999A:1–9.
Samango-Sprouse, C. A., Stapleton, E., Mitchell, F. L., Sadeghin, T., Donahue, T. P., 
Gropman, A. L. (2014). Expanding the Phenotypic Profile of Boys with XXY – Is it all about the X?, Am J Med Genet Part A. 164(6):1464-9. doi: 10.1002/ajmg.a.36483. 
Samango-Sprouse, C. A., Stapleton, E., Aliabadi, F., Graw, R., Vickers, R., Haskell, K., 
Sadeghin, T., Jameson, R., Parmele, C. L., Gropman, A. L. (2014). Early Identification of Infants and Toddlers At Risk for Autism Spectrum Disorder (ASD) and Developmental Language Disorder (DLD), Autism.
Gropman A, Samango-Sprouse CA. (2013). Neurocognitive variance and neurological 
underpinnings of the X and Y chromosomal variations. Am J Med Genet Pt C Semin Med Genet. 163(1):35-43.
Samango-Sprouse C, Banjevic M, Ryan A, Sigurjonsson S, Zimmermann B, Hill M, Hall 
MP, Westemeyer M, Saucier J, Demko Z, Rabinowitz M. (2013). SNP-based non-invasive prenatal testing detects sex chromosome aneuploidies with high accuracy. Prenat Diagn. 33(7):643-9. doi: 10.1002/pd.4159.
Mehta A, Paduch DA. (2012). Klinefelter syndrome: an argument for early aggressive hormonal and fertility management. Fertility and sterility. 98(2):274-283.
Samango-Sprouse, CA; Sadeghin, T; Mitchell, FL; Dixon, T; Stapleton, E; Kingery, M; 
and Gropman, AG. (2012). Positive Effects of Short Course Androgen Therapy on the Neurodevelopmental Outcome In Boys with 47,XXY Syndrome at 36 and 72 Months of Age. Am J Med Genet Pt A. 161(3):501-8.DOI: 10.1002/ajmg.a.35769. 
Rebecca E. Rosenberg, J. Kiely Law, Connie Anderson, Carole Samango-Sprouse and 
Paul A. Law. (2012). Survey of Vaccine Beliefs and Practices Among Families Affected by Autism Spectrum Disorders. CLIN PEDIATR.
Samango-Sprouse, CA; Gropman, A; Sadeghin, T; Kingery, M; Lutz-Armstrong, M; 
Rogol, A. (2011). Early Effects of Short Course Androgen Therapy on Children with 49,XXXXY Syndrome on Neurodevelopmental Profile. Acta Pædiatrica. 100(6):861-5.
Visootsak J, Graham JM. (2009).Social function in multiple X and Y chromosome disorders: XXY, XYY, XXYY, XXXY. Dev Disabil Res Rev. 15(4): 328–332.
Visootsak, Jeannie; Graham, John M., Samango-Sprouse, C., Swerdloff, R., Simpson, 
J.L. (2008). "Klinefelter Syndrome." Management of Genetic Syndromes. 3rd Edition, Eds. Cassidy, S.B., Allanson, J.E. Wiley-Liss.
Samango-Sprouse, CA. (2007). “Frontal Lobe Development in Childhood ”, The Human 
Frontal Lobe: Functions and Disorders, 2nd Edition. Eds. Miller, BL and Cummings, JL Guilford Press, New York. 
Hall H, Hunt P, Hassold T. (2006). Meiosis and sex chromosome aneuploidy: how 
meiotic errors cause aneuploidy; how aneuploidy causes meiotic errors. Curr Opin Genet Dev. 16(3), 323–329.
Simpson JL, de la Cruz FF, Swerdloff RS, Samango-Sprouse C, Skakkebaek NE, 
Graham JM, Hassold T, Aylstock M, et al. (2003). Klinefelter syndrome: Expanding the phenotype and identifying new research directions. Genet Med. 5(6):460–468.
Samango-Sprouse, C.A., and Rogol, A. (2002). “XXY: The Hidden Disability and 
Prototype for Infantile Presentation of Developmental Dyspraxia (IDD).”  Infants and Young Children. 
Abramsky L, Chapple J. (1997). 47,XXY (Klinefelter syndrome) and 47,XYY: Estimated 
rates of and indicated for postnatal diagnosis with implications for prenatal counseling. Prenat Diag. 17: 363–368.

Organizations for children with health issues
Organizations established in 2005
Medical and health organizations based in Maryland
Genetics organizations